San Fran Sessions is a box set compilation which collects 60 demos, outtakes, rarities and unissued performances recorded by The Beau Brummels from 1964 to 1966. The three-disc set, released by Sundazed Records on June 11, 1996, includes alternate takes of the band's singles "Laugh, Laugh" and "Just a Little", as well as early versions of songs that were likely targeted for their never-completed third album on Autumn Records.

Background
In addition to demos and alternate takes of some of the Beau Brummels' early material, San Fran Sessions contains songs—such as "I Grow Old", "Gentle Wandering Ways", "Dream On", "Love is Just a Game", "This is Love", and "Hey Love"—that were recorded in 1965 and early 1966 and were likely planned for the band's third album on Autumn Records. 
Ultimately, the album was never finished because the entire Autumn roster, including the Beau Brummels, was transferred in early 1966 to Warner Bros. Records, who wanted the band to record an album of cover versions of recent hits. 
The result was Beau Brummels '66, released in July.

Critical reception

Author and music journalist Richie Unterberger said San Fran Sessions "should only be acquired by serious fans of the band" and added, "from a historical viewpoint, it's interesting in that it presents a lot of previously unheard Sal Valentino-penned tunes (Ron Elliott wrote most of the songs that ended up on official releases)". 
Unterberger favorably compared the previously unreleased tracks to the rest of the band's Autumn material, praising the band's "beautifully sad harmonies and glittering guitar arrangements". He noted the album also features "substantially different versions of officially released songs like "Laugh, Laugh" and "Just a Little".

Track listing

Disc one

Disc two

Disc three

References

External links
 [ San Fran Sessions] at Allmusic

The Beau Brummels albums
1996 compilation albums
Sundazed Records compilation albums